Mount Sutherland is a peak 1.4 nautical miles (2.6 km) west-northwest of the summit of Mount Terror on Ross Island. The feature rises to c.2500 m. Named by Advisory Committee on Antarctic Names (US-ACAN) (2000) after Alexander L. Sutherland, Jr., Ocean Projects Manager, OPP, National Science Foundation (NSF), with responsibility for directing operations and logistics for United States Antarctic Program (USAP) research vessels from 1989; responsible for acquisition of the Research Vessel/Ice Breakers Nathaniel B. Palmer and Laurence M. Gould.

Mountains of Ross Island